Nobutoshi (written: 延年, 信敏, 喜稔 or 暢年) is a masculine Japanese given name. Notable people with the name include:

 (born 1937), Japanese diplomat
 (born 1968), Japanese voice actor
 (born 1956), Japanese judoka
 (born 1958), Japanese footballer
 (1926–2011), Japanese electronics engineer
 (1851–1887), Japanese daimyō
 (1853–1901), Japanese daimyō

Japanese masculine given names